Last of the Summer Wine's fourteenth series aired on BBC1 in 1992. All of the episodes were written by Roy Clarke and produced and directed by Alan J. W. Bell.

This was the first series to be shot entirely on film, although the complete episode was still assembled on videotape. This and the following series were broadcast in a 14:9 aspect ratio, compared to the standard 4:3 aspect ratio that it was broadcast in for its previous 13 series.

Outline
The trio in this series consisted of:

List of episodes
Regular series

Christmas Special (1992)

DVD release
The box set for series fourteen was released by Universal Playback in October 2009, mislabelled as a box set for series 15 & 16.

References

See also

Last of the Summer Wine series
1992 British television seasons